Dorning Rasbotham (c. 1730 – 7 November 1791) was an English writer, antiquarian and artist.
He was also High Sheriff of Lancashire (1769).

Dorning Rasbotham was the son of Peter and Hannah (Dorning) Rasbotham. He was married to Sarah Bayley c. 1754.

 His portrait as a stipple and line engraving by Henry Robinson, after Henry Pickering was published in 1833.
 
His paintings may be found in the archive collections of the National Portrait Gallery, London: 
John Byrom by Dorning Rasbotham, etching, mid 18th century NPG D18109
John Byrom by Dorning Rasbotham, etching, mid 18th century NPG D18110
Possibly Dorning Rasbotham by Dorning Rasbotham, pen and ink, 1750s −1780s, NPG D18106
View of Old Blackfriars Bridge and St. Mary's Church by Dorning Rasbotham, etching, 1775, NPG D18108
James Wylde by Dorning Rasbotham, pen and ink, 1780s, NPG D18107

He died in Farnworth, near Bolton, Lancashire. One of his sons, another Dorning Rasbotham, is associated with Alkrington Hall, Middleton near Rochdale, a noble brick building surrounded by a park of ), whose architect was Giacomo Leoni (1686–1746). In 1845 the hall and estate were sold by Doming Rasbotham – the nephew of John Lever (of the Sir Ashton Lever family) to the Lees brothers of Clarksfield, Oldham, Lancashire, for £57,550.

References 
History of Lancashire by Edward Baines, MP, Vol III, Published by Fisher and Son, London, 1836
 Dorning in England and America by Barbara Dennis and Jeanne Walker.

External links 
National Portrait Gallery images
Dorning Rasbotham at Dorning.net
early Dornings
Dorning family

1730 births
1791 deaths
People from Farnworth
18th-century English painters
English male painters
English portrait painters
High Sheriffs of Lancashire
18th-century English male artists